Athrips thymifoliella is a moth of the family Gelechiidae. It is found in North Africa, France and Spain.

The wingspan is about 10–12 mm. The forewings are brown mottled with grey scales and with two black spots at the fold surrounded by orange, and an indistinct spot at one-third near the costa, another spot at three-quarters and two elongate orange spots in the middle. The subapical area is grey with some black scales. The hindwings are grey. Adults are on wing in October and November.

The larvae feed on Fumana thymifolia. They feed between spun leaves from within a silken tube.

References

Moths described in 1893
Athrips
Moths of Europe
Moths of Africa